Nellore Airport is a proposed greenfield airport project near Dagadarthi, India, intended to serve the Nellore district in Andhra Pradesh.

History

Planning 
In 2008, the government of Andhra Pradesh invited for expressions of interest to develop eight minor airports in the state, including an airport at Nellore. Each airport was expected to cost . However, AAI has rejected this proposal citing insufficient land available for the construction of the airport.

In 2013, Ministry of Civil Aviation had identified Nellore airport as one of the 50 locations across the country for low-cost airports to be built by the AAI. These airports would be built with bare minimum facilities for aircraft to operate, without compromising on safety and security.

In September 2017, the government of Andhra Pradesh solicited proposals for development of a no-frills greenfield airport at Dagadarthi under a public-private partnership. The development proposal by SCL-Turbo Consortium Pvt. Ltd. was accepted, along with the associated draft concession agreement and financial stipulations. The Arafath Group and ADP Ingénierie was to construct and operate the airport. SCL Turbo has formed a special purpose vehicle (SPV) Nellore International Airport Private Limited for the construction.

Construction 
The project had received all clearances and approvals from various agencies. As per the agreement, the financial closure for the project was to be achieved by December 2018. On January 26, 2018, during his Republic Day speech, the District Collector R. Mutyala Raju announced that the acquisition of land for the airport was nearly completed.

The foundation stone was laid by then Andhra Pradesh Chief Minister N. Chandrababu Naidu on January 10, 2019. However, the YSR Congress Party led government, which was elected in May that year, moved to review all the major decisions taken by the previous government. In August 2019, the new government terminated its contract with Nellore International Airport Private Limited to develop the airport. The government said it would complete the project by handing the airport over to the AAI. In July 2020, the government formally scrapped the concession agreement signed with the SCL Turbo consortium. Later in November same year, the government has invited fresh bids from national and international companies for the construction of the airport.

After the government approved the report on Dec 21st 2021, It's expected that the first phase work could start as soon as April 2022.

References

Airports in Andhra Pradesh
Proposed airports in Andhra Pradesh
Buildings and structures in Nellore district
Transport in Nellore district